Bakhta may refer to:

Places
Bakhta (river), Russia
Bakhta (Turukhansky district), a village in Russia
Talwandi Bakhta, a village in Punjab, India
Kot Bakhta, a village in Punjab, India

People
Ali Bakhta, Algerian sportsman

See also
 Bhakta, a Sanskrit term